Sirani is a village and deh in Badin taluka of Badin District, Sindh. As of 2017, it has a population of 3,326, in 633 households. It is the seat of a tapedar circle, which also includes the villages of Bejoriro, Bidhadi, Chel, Ghurbi, Jakhralo, Maja Basri, Runghadi, and Talli. It is also the headquarters of a supervisory tapedar circle, which also includes the tapedar circles of Bandho, Bhadmi, Chorhadi, Daleji, Kak, and Lunwari Sharif. Sirani is also the seat of a Union Council, which has a total population of 43,200.

References 

Populated places in Badin District